The mixed doubles tournament of the 2018 BWF World Championships (World Badminton Championships) took place from 30 July to 5 August.

Seeds

The seeding list is based on the World Rankings from 12 July 2018.

  Zheng Siwei / Huang Yaqiong (world champions)
  Wang Yilü / Huang Dongping (final)
  Tang Chun Man / Tse Ying Suet (semifinals)
  Mathias Christiansen / Christinna Pedersen (quarterfinals)
  Zhang Nan / Li Yinhui (semifinals)
  Chris Adcock / Gabby Adcock (quarterfinals)
  Goh Soon Huat / Shevon Jemie Lai (third round)
  Chan Peng Soon / Goh Liu Ying (quarterfinals)

  He Jiting / Du Yue (third round)
  Dechapol Puavaranukroh / Sapsiree Taerattanachai (third round)
  Marcus Ellis / Lauren Smith (third round)
  Hafiz Faizal / Gloria Emanuelle Widjaja (third round)
  Praveen Jordan / Melati Daeva Oktavianti (third round)
  Wang Chi-lin / Lee Chia-hsin (third round)
  Mark Lamsfuß / Isabel Herttrich (second round)
  Yuta Watanabe / Arisa Higashino (third round)

Draw

Finals

Top half

Section 1

Section 2

Bottom half

Section 3

Section 4

References

External links
Draw

2018 BWF World Championships
World Championships